Blind Man may refer to:

The Blind Man, an art and Dada journal published briefly by the New York Dadaists in 1917
Blind Man (Aerosmith song), 1994
Blind Man (The Darkness song), 2005
Blind Man (Black Stone Cherry song), 2008
Blind Man (film), 2012 French film
 "Blind Man", a song by Bobby Bland
 "Blind Man", a song by Trife Diesel from Better Late Than Never
 "Blind Man", a 1965 single by Little Milton
The Blind Man (painting), 1910 painting by Gustave Van de Woestyne